Ezzabad (also Romanized as ‘Ezzābād; also known as Ez Abad Marvdasht and ‘Ezzābād-e Marvdasht) is a village in Khobriz Rural District, in the Central District of Arsanjan County, Fars Province, Iran. At the 2006 census, its population was 178, in 38 families.

References 

Populated places in Arsanjan County